Ledes is a surname. Notable people with the surname include:

 Luís Gustavo Ledes (born 1992), Portuguese footballer
 Richard Ledes (born 1956), American filmmaker and writer
 Robert Ledes, c. fourteenth century politician

See also
 Legal Electronic Data Exchange Standard